Peter Antonio Žulj (born 9 June 1993) is an Austrian professional footballer who plays as a midfielder for Chinese Super League club Changchun Yatai, and the Austria national team.

Career
Žulj was developed by the youth system of Rapid Wien, but he never appeared for the club's first team. After loan spells in the Austrian Football First League with Grödig and Hartberg, he joined Austrian Football Bundesliga side Wolfsberger AC in January 2014.

On 9 May 2018, he played in the game in which Sturm Graz beat Red Bull Salzburg in extra time to win the 2017–18 Austrian Cup.

In January 2019, he signed a 3.5 years contract with Anderlecht.

On 1 September 2022, Žulj joined Chinese Super League club Changchun Yatai.

International career
In February 2014, Žulj was called up the Austria under-21 squad for the first time.

He debuted for the senior Austria national football team in a friendly 4–0 win over Luxembourg on 27 March 2018.

Personal life
Žulj was born in Wels, Austria and is of Burgenland Croatian descent. Peter Žulj is the younger brother of Robert Žulj, who is also a professional footballer.

Honours
Sturm Graz
Austrian Cup: 2017–18
Individual
Austrian  Bundesliga Team of the Year:  2017–18

References

External links
 OFB Profile

1993 births
Living people
People from Wels
Footballers from Upper Austria
Austrian footballers
Austria international footballers
Austria youth international footballers
Austria under-21 international footballers
Austrian people of Croatian descent
Burgenland Croats
Association football midfielders
Austrian Football Bundesliga players
2. Liga (Austria) players
Austrian Regionalliga players
Belgian Pro League players
Süper Lig players
Nemzeti Bajnokság I players
SV Grödig players
TSV Hartberg players
Wolfsberger AC players
FC Admira Wacker Mödling players
SV Ried players
SK Sturm Graz players
R.S.C. Anderlecht players
Göztepe S.K. footballers
İstanbul Başakşehir F.K. players
Fehérvár FC players
Austrian expatriate footballers
Expatriate footballers in Belgium
Austrian expatriate sportspeople in Belgium
Expatriate footballers in Turkey
Austrian expatriate sportspeople in Turkey
Expatriate footballers in Hungary
Austrian expatriate sportspeople in Hungary